Antenna, better known as ANT1, is the first private television station in Cyprus and already counts 30 years of dynamic and credible presence in the market. Since its formation, the station has been the leader in ratings in both its news bulletins as well its local series, Greek programme, that is wholly supplied from ANT1 in Greece and foreign entertainment which ranges from daily series to shows and blockbuster films.

The company has also formed ANT1 Radio 102,7 - 103,7 in 1998 which is mainly focused on the entertainment aspect with high-quality entertaining and informative programmes that attract tens of thousands of listeners per day, anytime and anywhere. With regards its online presence, ant1live.com covers breaking news,  sports and lifestyle news, broadcasts ANT1 TV and radio streams for free and provides a high-quality Video On Demand service for the company's programmes. Furthermore, there is a dedicated section on the website that covers aspects of European Union, that ranges from news to interviews and reports, providing users with the opportunity to be kept updated and informed with everything that has to do with the EU.

Both units have been enjoying exponential growth in both status and ratings and together with the company's main focus, the television unit established a firm status of the ANTENNA brand image as the most solid presence in the media world of Cyprus. This exponential growth can be confirmed through Nielsen Audience Measurement, enlisting ANTENNA as one of the lead weekly channels in Cyprus with an average of 14% (17.3% in ages 18–54) of the audience share.

New, but solidified to this experience, is the expertise implementation and knowledge in the field of Digital Media. The proliferation of users using Social Media Platforms, arouse ANTENNA's desire to disseminate news, videos, events or everything that has to do with broadcasting and screening, engage with users and provide a trustworthy source of newscast through its various Social Media Platforms, like Facebook, YouTube, Instagram, Messenger, Twitter etc.

Programming
Current shows include:
Proino ANT1
Mera Mesimeri
ANT1 News

Realities
Dancing with the Stars – the Greek version of reality program, third season ongoing. Hosted by Zeta Makripoulia.
The Biggest Game Show in the World – Reality television show. Hosted by Nantia Mpoule. It will premiere in fall 2013.
Krata Gera – Reality television show. Hosted by Giorgos Lianos. It will premiere in fall 2013.
Wipeout – the Greek version of the American reality show which entering its second season in fall 2011. Hosted by Giorgos Lianos.
Plaka Kaneis – Prank reality television show, much like the format used on Candid Camera. Hosted by Savvas Poumpouras and Dimitris Vlachos.
Dancing on Ice – the Greek version of English reality show dance competition which now it's in the first season. Hosted by Jenny Balatsinou.
FAB 5 – the Greek version of American reality show Queer Eye, one season done.
Black Out – 2011 game show, one season done. Hosted by Nadia Boule.
Meet the Parents – the Greek version of the English reality show, one season is done. Hosted by Savvas Poumpouras.
Fast Money! – the Greek version of Family Feud, hosted by Mark Seferlis.

Television series

Cypriot
H Goiteia Ths Amartias (The allure of sin), drama (2002)
Deikse mou to filo sou, comedy (2006–2007)
Tin Patisa, comedy (2007–2008)
I Zoi Einai Oraia, comedy (2008–2009)
Aigia Fouxia, comedy (2008–2010)
Panselinos (Full Moon), soap opera (2009–2011)
Eleni I Porni, drama based on real story (2010–2011)
Premiera (Premiere), drama based on real story (2011–2012)
Santa Giolanta, comedy (2011–2012)
O,ti Agapisa, soap opera (2011–2012)
Like, Like ise edo?, family comedy (2011–2012)
Niose Me (Feel Me), soap opera (2012–2014)
Vals Me 12 Theous, based on the homonym book (2012–2014)
Ekino To Kalokairi (That summer), drama based on real story (2012–2013)

Greek
Kales Douleies, family comedy (2014–present)
Brousko, soap opera (2013–present)
To Amartima tis Mitros mou, family comedy (2012–2013)
Eleftheros kai Oraios, comedy (2012)
Einai Stigmes, soap opera (2012)
Steps, teen drama (2011)

English
Game of Thrones (United States)
Grey's Anatomy (United States)
House (United States)
Private Practise (United States)
Castle (United States)
Nikita (United States)
Mighty Morphin Power Rangers (United States)
Horseland (United States)

Spanish
Amores verdaderos (Mexico)
La Tempestad (Mexico)
Eva Luna (United States)
Triunfo del amor (Mexico)
Soy tu dueña (Mexico)
Corazón salvaje (Mexico)
Sortilegio (Mexico)
La fea más bella (Mexico)
Floricienta (Argentina)
Rebelde Way (Argentina)
Romeo y Julieta (Argentina)

Japanese
Sailor Moon (Japan)

External links
Official site

Television channels in Cyprus
ANT1 Group
Greek-language television stations
Television channels and stations established in 1993